Dover is a constituency in Kent, England represented in the House of Commons of the Parliament of the United Kingdom.

Dover was considered a Cinque Ports constituency from 1386 to 1832.

Constituency profile
The seat includes most of Dover District. It comprises the towns of Deal, Dover, Walmer and surrounding villages in a productive chalkland, long-cultivated area adjoining the Strait of Dover. Since 1983 it has excluded the northern part of the District in and around the historically important Cinque Port of Sandwich with its golf links and accessible shore, which was then transferred to the South Thanet seat.

Since 1945 Dover has been a Labour/Conservative swing seat. In local elections, most of its rural villages and the two small towns favour the Conservative Party, whereas Dover favours the Labour Party, as well as the former mixed mining and agricultural villages in the local coal belt (East Kent coalfield), such as Aylesham. Labour's vote held on very solidly here in 2005, but the seat went Conservative in the 2010 election on a swing of 10.4% compared with a 4.9% swing nationally.

Cinque Port Seat

Dover's representation was originally as a Cinque Port constituency.  In the sixteenth and seventeenth the Lord Warden of the Cinque Ports nominated one member as with other Cinque Ports, but this was outlawed by an act of Parliament in 1689. There was still some residual influence but there was also a local independent element in the borough with two local leading families, the Papillons and Furneses, starting to send MPs.  By the mid eighteenth century it had come more under government influence through the influence of the Earl of Hardwicke, although government control was often more fragile than it seemed.

Dover lost its status as a Cinque Port seat, becoming a borough seat under the 1832 Reform Act.

Boundaries

1918–1950: The Boroughs of Dover and Deal, the Urban District of Walmer, and the Rural Districts of Dover and Eastry.

1950–1983: The Boroughs of Dover, Deal, and Sandwich, the Rural District of Dover, and the Rural District of Eastry except the parishes included in the Isle of Thanet constituency.

1983–2010: The District of Dover wards of Aylesham, Barton, Buckland, Capel-le-Ferne, Castle, Cornilo, Eastry, Eythorne, Lower Walmer, Lydden and Temple Ewell, Maxton and Elms Vale, Middle Deal, Mill Hill, Mongeham, Noninstone, North Deal, Pineham, Priory, Ringwould, River, St Margaret's-at-Cliffe, St Radigund's, Shepherdswell with Coldred, Tower Hamlets, Town and Pier, and Upper Walmer.

2010–present: The District of Dover wards of Aylesham, Buckland, Capel-le-Ferne, Castle, Eastry, Eythorne and Shepherdswell, Lydden and Temple Ewell, Maxton, Elms Vale and Priory, Middle Deal and Sholden, Mill Hill, North Deal, Ringwould, River, St Margaret's-at-Cliffe, St Radigund's, Tower Hamlets, Town and Pier, Walmer, and Whitfield.

Charlie Elphicke scandal
From 2010, the MP was Charlie Elphicke, elected as a member of the Conservative Party. On 3 November 2017, Elphicke was suspended by the Conservative Party after "serious allegations" were made against him, and then sat as an Independent until 12 December 2018 when he had the Conservative Whip restored ahead of a party vote on a no-confidence motion against Theresa May.  In July 2019, the whip was withdrawn again after he was charged by the Crown Prosecution Service with three counts of sexual assault against two women. Charlie Elphicke stood down as an MP shortly before the 2019 UK General Election, with his wife, Natalie Elphicke standing as the Conservative Party candidate in his place. Natalie Elphicke was elected as the MP for Dover at the 2019 UK General Election, increasing on her husband's majority.

Members of Parliament

Cinque Port/Parliamentary Borough 1386–1918

MPs 1386–1660

No parliament called between 1629 and 1640

MPs 1660–1885

MPs 1885–1918

County constituency 1918–present

Elections in the 19th century

Elections in the 1830s

Elections in the 1840s

Elections in the 1850s

Elections in the 1860s

Elections in the 1870s

Elections in the 1880s

Elections in the 1890s

Elections in the 20th century

Elections in the 1900s

Elections in the 1910s

Elections in the 1920s

Elections in the 1930s

withdrew on 16 October

Election in the 1940s

Elections in the 1950s

Elections in the 1960s

Elections in the 1970s

Elections in the 1980s

Elections in the 1990s

Elections in the 21st century

Elections in the 2000s

Elections in the 2010s

See also 
List of parliamentary constituencies in Kent

References

Sources
 Robert Beatson, A Chronological Register of Both Houses of Parliament (London: Longman, Hurst, Res & Orme, 1807) 
 The Constitutional Year Book for 1913 (London: National Union of Conservative and Unionist Associations, 1913)
 F. W. S. Craig, British Parliamentary Election Results 1832–1885 (2nd edition, Aldershot: Parliamentary Research Services, 1989)
 F. W. S. Craig, British Parliamentary Election Results 1918–1949 (Glasgow: Political Reference Publications, 1969)

1369 establishments in England
Dover District
Parliamentary constituencies in Kent
Cinque ports parliament constituencies
Members of Parliament for Dover